The Raggedy Queen is a 1917 American silent drama film directed by Theodore Marston and starring Violet Mersereau, Grace Barton and Donald Hall.

Cast
 Violet Mersereau as Tatters
 Grace Barton as Crazy Anne
 Donald Hall as Hugh Tillson
 Robert F. Hill as Tom Brennon
 Charles Slattery as Lem Braxton
 James O'Neill as Father Andre
 Frank Otto as David Grant

References

Bibliography
 Robert B. Connelly. The Silents: Silent Feature Films, 1910-36, Volume 40, Issue 2. December Press, 1998.

External links
 

1917 drama films
1910s English-language films
American silent feature films
Silent American drama films
American black-and-white films
Universal Pictures films
Films directed by Theodore Marston